Marco Sahanek (born 27 January 1990), is an Austrian professional footballer who lastly plays as an attacking midfielder for Indian Super League club NorthEast United.

Club career
On 21 January 2022, Sahanek joined Indian Super League club NorthEast United till the end of 2021–22 Indian Super League season. He made his debut against Chennaiyin on 22 January, which ended in a 2–1 loss as a substitute for Sehnaj Singh in the 64th minute of the game. He scored a goal against East Bengal in 28 February, Which ended in a 1–1 draw.

References

External links

1990 births
Living people
Austrian footballers
Austrian expatriate footballers
ASK Schwadorf players
FC Admira Wacker Mödling players
Wolfsberger AC players
Kapfenberger SV players
SK Austria Klagenfurt players
SV Horn players
FC Wacker Innsbruck (2002) players
Floridsdorfer AC players
Hibernians F.C. players
Marco Sahanek
Marco Sahanek
2. Liga (Austria) players
Austrian Football Bundesliga players
Austrian Regionalliga players
Maltese Premier League players
Association football midfielders
Expatriate footballers in Malta
Austrian expatriate sportspeople in India
Austrian expatriate sportspeople in Malta
Austrian expatriate sportspeople in Thailand
Expatriate footballers in Thailand
Expatriate footballers in India
Footballers from Vienna